Dominic (I) from the kindred Rátót (died 11 April 1241) was a Hungarian distinguished nobleman from the gens Rátót, who served as master of the treasury between 1238 and 1240. His father was Rathold Rátót, ispán (comes) of Somogy County in 1203. His younger brother was Baldwin I Rátót. Dominic I had four sons and a daughter (spouse of Maurice II Pok).

He also functioned as ispán of Nyitra (1238) and Bihar Counties (1240). He was killed in the Battle of Mohi on 11 April 1241.

References

Sources
  Markó, László (2006). A magyar állam főméltóságai Szent Istvántól napjainkig – Életrajzi Lexikon ("The High Officers of the Hungarian State from Saint Stephen to the Present Days – A Biographical Encyclopedia") (2nd edition); Helikon Kiadó Kft., Budapest; .
  Zsoldos, Attila (2011). Magyarország világi archontológiája, 1000–1301 ("Secular Archontology of Hungary, 1000–1301"). História, MTA Történettudományi Intézete. Budapest. 

1241 deaths
Dominic 01
Hungarian military personnel killed in the Mongol invasion of Europe
Year of birth unknown
13th-century Hungarian people
Masters of the treasury (Kingdom of Hungary)